Mieczysław Waśkowski (13 August 1929 – 14 November 2001) was a Polish actor and film director. He appeared in more than 20 films and television shows between 1955 and 1978.

Selected filmography
 Zacne grzechy (1963)
 Hazardziści (1976)

References

External links

1929 births
2001 deaths
Polish male film actors
Polish film directors
People from Białobrzegi County